The Patrol of Buwat took place in October 623 or 2 A.H. of the Islamic calendar, in Rabi' al-Awwal. Muhammad went with a force of 200 men in order to raid parties of the Quraysh. Muhammad stayed at Buwat for some time and left without engaging in combat.

Background and raid
Approximately a month after the patrol of Wadden, Muhammad personally led two hundred men including Muhajirs and Ansars to Bawat, a place on the caravan route of the Quraysh raiders led by Umayyah ibn Khalaf. Ibn Khalaf was believed to have tortured a Muslim named Bilal Ibn Rabah and had strongly opposed Islam. However, no battle took place. According to Haykal, Umayyah ibn Khalaf took another route. Muhammad then went up to Dhat al-Saq in the desert of al-Khabar. He prayed there and a mosque was built at the spot.

See also
List of expeditions of Muhammad
Muhammad as a general
Muslim–Quraysh War

References

623
Campaigns led by Muhammad